Narara Valley High School (abbreviated as NVHS) is a government-funded co-educational comprehensive secondary day school, located in Narara, in the Central Coast region of New South Wales, Australia.

The school caters for approximately 800 students in 2020, from Year 7 to Year 12, of whom eight percent identified as Indigenous Australians and eleven percent were from a language background other than English. The school is operated by the NSW Department of Education; and the current principal is Mr. Andrew Skehan.

Extracurricular & co-curricular

Music 
The school runs several music programs, including a selective Creative and Performing Arts Program (CAPA) and a concert band that frequently plays music at fund-raising events for the school and charity. Music classes are mandatory for all students enrolled in years 7 and 8, and the subject may be continued as an elective if a student wishes.

Academic acceleration program 
The school runs an Academic Acceleration program for highly engaged students who are invited to join a modified class that aims to complete the HSC a year earlier than the cohort they initially joined with.

See also 

 List of government schools in New South Wales
 Education in Australia

References

External links
 
NSW Schools website

Public high schools in New South Wales
Central Coast (New South Wales)